"Speed" is a song by British singer-songwriter Billy Idol, originally included in the soundtrack of the eponymous film. It was written by himself and by guitarist Steve Stevens, and released in August 1994 as the film's main song through Arista Records worldwide and Chrysalis Records in the United States.

Background 
In early 1994, producers of the film Speed chose record producer Ralph Sall as music supervisor of the soundtrack. Sall was in charge of creating a concept album with a compilation of new and old songs in different genres and featuring diverse artists, with a theme similar to this action thriller film. The resulting soundtrack contains songs about speed, cars or travelling. Shortly after, Sall contacted Bily Idol and his close collaborator, guitarist Steve Stevens, to compose and record the film's main song with lyrics inspired by its plot.

By that time, Idol's career was convulsed and in full decline after the critical and financial failure with his album 
Cyberpunk (1993). In addition, he was facing economic differences with his record label (EMI), and his personal problems with drug abuse were on the rise. Thus, this new song was an important opportunity to return to his audience.

"Speed" was composed and recorded in a short time in Los Angeles with the support of an uncredited band, possibly completed with drummer Mark Schulman and bassist Larry Seymour (live members by that time). The song is based on a similar drum tempo and guitar riff that was the basis for Idol's "Rebel Yell" hit (1983), following the same formula in terms of feeling.

Release and promotion 
Arista Records released "Speed" on 7-inch vinyl, CD, and cassette in the United Kingdom on 30 August 1994. The single includes three different versions of "Speed" and a live acoustic version of "Rebel Yell" (until then unreleased) accompanying the lead song only on the UK CD single release. In 2008, "Speed" was included in the compilation album The Very Best of Billy Idol: Idolize Yourself. The single was promoted with a music video that mixed some of the most vibrant scenes of the film along with a fictional live performance of Billy Idol, Steve Stevens and the rest of their rock band.

Reception 
On the US Billboard Album Rock Tracks chart, "Speed" peaked number 38 on 23 July 1994. On the UK Singles Chart, it reached number 47 on 9 October that year, becoming Idol's last charting single in the UK.

Track listing 
 "Speed" (single version) – 4:22
 "Speed" (extended version) – 5:22
 "Speed" (instrumental) – 5:23
 "Rebel Yell (acoustic version) – 5:35
 Track 4 was recorded at the KROQ Acoustic Christmas concert on 11 December 1993 at the Universal Amphitheatre, Los Angeles. Recording by Westwood One Radio.

Personnel 
 Design – Jigsaw [London] Ltd. 
 Engineering – Clif Norrell
 Engineering [Recording] – Biff Dawes (track four)
 Production – Billy Idol, Ralph Sall, Steve Stevens
 Writing – Billy Idol, Steve Stevens

Charts

References

External links 
 "Speed" at Discogs

1994 songs
1994 singles
Arista Records singles
Billy Idol songs
Chrysalis Records singles
Songs written by Billy Idol
Songs written by Steve Stevens
Songs written for films